The eastern jungle crow (Corvus levaillantii) is a bird in the family Corvidae. It is found in China, Bangladesh, India, Myanmar, Nepal, Bhutan, and Thailand.

References

External links
Eastern jungle crow sounds on xeno-canto.

Corvus
Birds described in 1831
Birds of Southeast Asia
Taxonomy articles created by Polbot
Taxobox binomials not recognized by IUCN